Vincent "Vinny" Lecavalier (born April 21, 1980) is a Canadian former professional ice hockey player who is currently a special advisor of hockey operations for the Montreal Canadiens. Lecavalier played seventeen seasons in the National Hockey League (NHL) between 1998 and 2016. He  was the captain of the Tampa Bay Lightning for the 2000–2001 season and again from 2008–2013 and spent his first 14 NHL seasons with the Tampa Bay Lightning before being bought out following the 2012–13 season and signing with the Philadelphia Flyers for $22.5 million over 5 years. He was chosen first overall by the Lightning in the 1998 NHL Entry Draft and was a member of their 2004 Stanley Cup championship team. He won the Maurice "Rocket" Richard Trophy in 2007 as the NHL's leading goal scorer. On February 10, 2018, the Tampa Bay Lightning retired his number 4 jersey.

Playing career
As a youth, Lecavalier played in the 1994 Quebec International Pee-Wee Hockey Tournament with a minor ice hockey team from the North Shore of Montreal.

Rimouski Océanic
Lecavalier played two years of junior hockey for the Rimouski Océanic of the Quebec Major Junior Hockey League (QMJHL). During his tenure, he quickly established himself as one of the NHL's top prospects. In his first season with the Océanic, he won the Michel Bergeron Trophy as the QMJHL's top rookie forward, and the RDS Cup as the top rookie overall.

Tampa Bay Lightning (1998–2013)
Lecavalier was drafted first overall by Tampa Bay in the 1998 NHL Entry Draft, during which new Lightning owner Art Williams proclaimed that Lecavalier would be "the Michael Jordan of hockey".

On March 1, 2000, following his sophomore season, he was named captain, becoming the youngest captain in NHL history at 19 years and 314 days (since surpassed by Sidney Crosby,  Gabriel Landeskog, and Connor McDavid). Previously, Steve Yzerman had held that honour, having been named captain of the Detroit Red Wings at 21 years, 5 months.

However, Lecavalier did not fulfill expectations and was later stripped of the captaincy before the 2001–02 NHL season when Lightning management decided he was too young even as a high calibre player. Around that time, he clashed frequently with head coach John Tortorella.

Tortorella has since noted that Lecavalier matured since losing the team captaincy. During the 2003–04 NHL season, while Martin St. Louis led in regular season scoring and Brad Richards led in the playoffs, Lecavalier played a key role in the team's Stanley Cup victory, assisting on the Cup-clinching goal. He was named MVP of the Canadian National Team in the 2004 World Cup of Hockey, which Canada won.

During the lock-out which cancelled the 2004–05 NHL season, Lecavalier, along with Lightning teammates Nikolai Khabibulin and Brad Richards, played for Ak Bars Kazan in the Russian Superleague. Lecavalier scored 15 points as Kazan finished 4th in the league and lost in the first round of the playoffs.

Lecavalier was chosen to play for Team Canada at the 2006 Olympics, but returned to Tampa without a medal.

Lecavalier broke the all-time Tampa Bay Lightning record for most points in a season by scoring his 95th point on March 16, 2007, against the Buffalo Sabres. The record was previously held by Martin St. Louis, who had 94 points during the 2003–04 NHL season. His record of 108 points was since surpassed by Nikita Kucherov, who recorded Art Ross trophy-winning 128 points during the 2018-19 NHL season and holds the record at this point.

On March 30, 2007, in a game against the Carolina Hurricanes, Lecavalier became the first Lightning player to record 50 goals in a season. He finished the season with 52 goals, edging Ottawa's Dany Heatley, who scored 50 goals, to earn the Maurice "Rocket" Richard Trophy as the NHL's top goal scorer for the 2006–07 season.

During the 2007–08 NHL season, Lecavalier recorded 8 straight multipoint games, being the first to do so since Jaromír Jágr in 1996.  The scoring streak put him first in the NHL scoring race, until he was surpassed by Ottawa Senators' captain, Daniel Alfredsson, who scored 7 points in the final game before the All-Star break. He was named captain of the Eastern Conference at the 2008 NHL All Star Game. At the end of the season he was named the winner of both the King Clancy Memorial Trophy and the NHL Foundation Player Award for his tremendous charity work in the community.

In the 2007–08 offseason, Lecavalier underwent shoulder surgery to repair a fracture from taking a hit against Matt Cooke of the Washington Capitals. He underwent another surgery on his left wrist later in the summer.

On July 12, 2008, Lecavalier agreed to an eleven-year, $85 million contract extension with the Lightning. His new contract began after the 2008–09 season, and ran through the 2019–20 season.

He was renamed captain of the Tampa Bay Lightning on September 18, 2008.

In mid-January 2009, rumours were swirling around a possible trade which would send Lecavalier to the Montreal Canadiens, his hometown, but Brian Lawton later stated that Lecavalier would rather stay in Tampa Bay for the rest of his career. Lecavalier confirmed in his own words his preference of playing in Tampa Bay over his native Montreal. On January 24, at the NHL's superskills competition, Lecavalier received a standing ovation from the Montreal crowd that lasted for 30 seconds when he was being introduced.

Lecavalier underwent season-ending wrist surgery on April 3, 2009.

On January 21, 2013, Lecavalier played in his 1000th NHL game, becoming the 280th NHL player to reach that milestone. His 1,000 games were all with the Tampa Bay Lightning.  The team honoured him on January 25, their next home game, with several gifts including an engraved silver stick.

In June 2013, the New York Post reported that the Lightning and Toronto Maple Leafs had discussed a trade which would have sent Lecavalier to Toronto; the Maple Leafs would receive an asset in exchange for buying out Lecavalier's contract and he would then be free to re-sign with Tampa as an unrestricted free agent at a lower salary cap hit. Though the Maple Leafs denied the report, NHL Deputy Commissioner Bill Daly promptly sent out a memo to all 30 league teams, warning them to avoid transactions deemed a circumvention of the collective bargaining agreement. The CBA prevents teams from re-signing players they've bought out for a minimum of one year. One day later, the Lightning announced that it was buying out Lecavalier's contract, allowing their longest serving player to become an unrestricted free agent. The buyout would pay Lecavalier a total of $32.67 million and rid the Lightning of his $7.727 million salary cap hit.

Philadelphia Flyers (2013–2016)
On July 2, 2013, less than a week after being bought out by the Lightning, Lecavalier signed with the Philadelphia Flyers who agreed to pay him $22.5 million over a five-year contract; which is in addition to the $2.33 million he will receive annually from the Lightning for the next 14 years. Lecavalier chose to wear number 40 with the Flyers as his usual number 4 had been retired by the Flyers in honour of Barry Ashbee. On November 27, 2013, Lecavalier made his first return to Tampa as a member of the Flyers and was welcomed with a tribute video as well as a long, standing ovation from Lightning fans. He scored a goal in his homecoming and was awarded the game's 3rd star. Lecavalier finished the season registering 20 goals and 17 assists, and scored his 400th career goal against the Boston Bruins on March 30, 2014. The Flyers qualified for the 2014 Stanley Cup Playoffs, before being eliminated in seven games by the New York Rangers, in which Lecavalier had one goal and an assist in the series.
The 2014-15 NHL season began quite poorly for Lecavalier, and on December 2, 2014 he was a healthy scratch for the first time in his career.

On April 9, 2015 in a game against the Carolina Hurricanes, Lecavalier fought twice against Hurricanes rookie Keegan Lowe, who was playing his first NHL game. Lecavalier didn't play the third period and may have suffered a concussion.

Los Angeles Kings (2016)
During the 2015–16 season, having played sparingly for the previous two seasons within the Flyers organization, Lecavalier was traded alongside Luke Schenn to the Los Angeles Kings in exchange for Jordan Weal and a third round pick on January 6, 2016. One of the stipulations of the trade was that Lecavalier would retire at the end of the season to keep the Kings from being saddled with his hit to the salary cap. With number 4 being retired for Rob Blake, Lecavalier chose number 44 for the Kings. He officially announced his retirement on June 21, 2016.

Personal life
Lecavalier went to John Rennie High School in Pointe-Claire, Quebec for two years (1992–1993) before transferring to Athol Murray College of Notre Dame in Wilcox, Saskatchewan. He has been friends with former teammate Brad Richards, who won the Conn Smythe Trophy in 2004 as Most Valuable Player of the NHL playoffs, since the age of 14, when they met at Notre Dame, where they were roommates and became best friends. Since then they have gone on to become teammates with the Rimouski Océanic, the Tampa Bay Lightning and also with Ak Bars Kazan. Lecavalier currently resides in Tampa's Davis Island.

Lecavalier began dating Caroline Portelance in 2001. After ten years of dating, the two were married in 2011. The couple have three children together.

He is featured in The Rocket: The Maurice Richard Story where he portrayed legendary Montreal Canadiens centre, Jean Béliveau. He wore number 4 to honour Béliveau.

EA Sports' video game NHL 06 featured Lecavalier as the cover athlete.

In October 2007, Lecavalier pledged $3 million to a new All Children's Hospital facility under construction in St. Petersburg, Florida. The facility was named the Vincent Lecavalier Pediatric Cancer and Blood Disorders Center in his honour.

On February 10, 2018, the Tampa Bay Lightning retired Lecavalier's number 4 jersey. Lecavalier is the second player in franchise history to have his jersey retired, the first being Martin St. Louis.

On March 17, 2023, Lecavalier was inducted into the Tampa Bay Lightning Hall of Fame, as a member of its inaugural class.

Career statistics

Regular season and playoffs
Bold indicates led league

International

Awards and honors

Junior
 QMJHL All-Rookie Team – 1997
 Michel Bergeron Trophy (QMJHL Offensive Rookie of the Year) – 1997
 RDS Cup (QMJHL Rookie of the Year) – 1997
 CHL All-Rookie Team – 1997
 CHL Rookie of the Year – 1997
 QMJHL first All-Star team – 1998
 Mike Bossy Trophy (QMJHL Top Draft Prospect) – 1998
 CHL first All-Star team – 1998
 CHL Top Draft Prospect Award – 1998

NHL
 Stanley Cup champion – 2004
 EA Sports NHL cover athlete - 2006
 Maurice "Rocket" Richard Trophy – 2007
 NHL second All-Star team – 2007
 King Clancy Memorial Trophy – 2008
 NHL Foundation Player Award – 2008
 NHL All-Star Game – 2003, 2007, 2008 (captain), 2009
 Tampa Bay Lightning #4 retired

International
 World Cup of Hockey – 2004
 World Cup of Hockey All-Star team – 2004
 World Cup of Hockey MVP – 2004

See also
 List of NHL players with 1000 games played

References

External links

 
 
 
 

1980 births
Living people
Ak Bars Kazan players
Canadian expatriate ice hockey players in the United States
Canadian ice hockey centres
Canadian people of French descent
French Quebecers
Ice hockey people from Montreal
Ice hockey players at the 2006 Winter Olympics
King Clancy Memorial Trophy winners
Los Angeles Kings players
National Hockey League All-Stars
National Hockey League first-overall draft picks
National Hockey League first-round draft picks
National Hockey League players with retired numbers
Olympic ice hockey players of Canada
People from L'Île-Bizard–Sainte-Geneviève
Philadelphia Flyers players
Rimouski Océanic players
Rocket Richard Trophy winners
Stanley Cup champions
Tampa Bay Lightning draft picks
Tampa Bay Lightning players
Canadian expatriate ice hockey players in Russia